John George March (25 November 1932 – 30 November 2017) was an English cricketer. March was a left-handed batsman who bowled slow left-arm orthodox. He was born in Ushaw Moor, County Durham.

March made his debut for Durham against the Lancashire Second XI in the 1963 Minor Counties Championship.  He played Minor counties cricket for Durham from 1963 to 1975, making 55 Minor Counties Championship appearances.  He made his List A debut against Oxfordshire in the 1972 Gillette Cup.  He made 3 further List A appearances for Durham, the last of which came against Essex in the 1973 Gillette Cup.  In his 4 List A matches, he scored 91 runs at an average of 22.75, with a high score of 78.  This score came against Surrey in the 1972 Gillette Cup.  With the ball, he took a single wicket which came at an overall cost of 18 runs.

References

External links
George March at ESPNcricinfo
George March at CricketArchive

1932 births
2017 deaths
People from Ushaw Moor
Cricketers from County Durham
English cricketers
Durham cricketers